Hibbertia elata is a species of flowering plant in the family Dilleniaceae and is endemic to a eastern Australia. It is an open shrub with hairy stems, clustered, narrow linear to narrow lance-shaped leaves with the narrower end towards the base, and yellow flowers usually with fifteen to twenty-five stamens arranged around the three carpels.

Description
Flowering occurs from summer to autumn.

Taxonomy
Hibbertia elata was first formally described in 1913 by Joseph Maiden and Ernst Betche in the Proceedings of the Linnean Society of New South Wales from specimens collected near the New South Wales - Queensland border. The specific epithet (elata) means "tall".

Distribution and habitat
This hibbertia grows on rocky slopes between Mudgee and Merriwa in New South Wales and near Wallangarra in Queensland.

See also
List of Hibbertia species

References

elata
Flora of New South Wales
Flora of Queensland
Plants described in 1913
Taxa named by Joseph Maiden
Taxa named by Ernst Betche